Simcha Dan Rothman (born 13 August 1980) is an Israeli lawyer, activist and politician. He is currently a member of the Knesset for the Religious Zionist Party.

Biography
Rothman was born into a family that had immigrated to Israel from Cleveland in the United States in the early 20th century. He was educated at Yeshivat Kerem B'Yavneh and served as a chaplain for the Combat Engineering Corps during his national service in the Israel Defense Forces. After earning an LLB at Bar-Ilan University he studied for a master's degree in public law at Tel Aviv University and Northwestern University.

He founded the Movement for Governability and Democracy in 2013. A critic of the corruption trial of Benjamin Netanyahu, he has campaigned for legislation to allow the government to override the Supreme Court and supports immunity from prosecution for serving prime ministers.

Prior to the 2021 Knesset elections Rothman was placed fourth on the Religious Zionist Party list, and was elected to the Knesset as the party won six seats.

Rothman is married with five children and lives in Pnei Kedem.

See also

 2023 Israeli judicial reform

References

External links

1980 births
Living people
Bar-Ilan University alumni
Israeli lawyers
Israeli Orthodox Jews
Israeli people of American-Jewish descent
Members of the 24th Knesset (2021–2022)
Members of the 25th Knesset (2022–)
Northwestern University alumni
People from Bnei Brak
Religious Zionist Party politicians
Tel Aviv University alumni